Kawabata Makoto is a Japanese musician and founding member of the band Acid Mothers Temple. He was part of one line-up of Gong when Acid Mothers Temple and Gong briefly fused into one group.

Band history 
Kawabata is chiefly famous for his leadership of Acid Mothers Temple and its variants; however, he has also played in many other bands since the start of his career in the late 1970s. Some of these bands are:

 Baroque Bordello
 Toho Sara
 Erochika
 Tsurubami
 Musica Transonic
 Mainliner
 Mothers of Invasion
 Nishinihon
 Floating Flower

Solo discography 

In addition to the many records recorded with bands, Kawabata Makoto has an extensive solo discography. Major releases are:

 The 'Private Tapes' series (1999–2004)
 Inui.1 (2000)
 Inui.2 (2000)
 I'm in Your Inner Most (2001)
 Hosanna Mantra (2007)
 Inui.4 (2007)
 We're one-sided lovers each other's (2013- Bam Balam.records)

Musical philosophy 
In 2000, Kawabata wrote "Music, for me, is neither something that I create, nor a form of self-expression. All kinds of sounds exist everywhere around us, and my performances solely consist of picking up these sounds, like a radio tuner, and playing them so that people can hear them."

"When I was a kid, I really loved Ritchie Blackmore – not so much the guitar style, just I liked his look, atmosphere, on the stage. Always, he stood on this side [right], also the stratocaster, and black clothes, and very aggressive [playing]. I really loved this image, so I wear just black. Also – easy to co-ordinate!"

References

External links

Japanese musicians
Living people
Mainliner (band) members
Musicians from Osaka
Year of birth missing (living people)